Efrain Saavedra Barrera (born February 8, 1945) is a Peruvian diplomat who has served for the Peruvian Diplomatic Office since 1972 in: Rome, Italy; Vatican City; Tegucigalpa, Honduras; Valparaíso, Chile; Chicago, United States; Montevideo, Uruguay; Buenos Aires, Argentina, and  Machala, Ecuador. He was Chief of Mission in Peru. He retired in 2015 after a 43-year-long career.

References

Living people
Peruvian diplomats
1945 births
Place of birth missing (living people)